In mathematics, a topological space is said to be ultraconnected if no two nonempty closed sets are disjoint. Equivalently, a space is ultraconnected if and only if the closures of two distinct points always have non trivial intersection. Hence, no T1 space with more than one point is ultraconnected.

Properties

Every ultraconnected space  is path-connected (but not necessarily arc connected).

Every ultraconnected space is normal, limit point compact, and pseudocompact.

Examples

The following are examples of ultraconnected topological spaces.
 A set with the indiscrete topology.
 The Sierpiński space.
 A set with the excluded point topology.
 The right order topology on the real line.

See also
 Hyperconnected space

Notes

References
 
 Lynn Arthur Steen and J. Arthur Seebach, Jr., Counterexamples in Topology. Springer-Verlag, New York, 1978. Reprinted by Dover Publications, New York, 1995.  (Dover edition).

Properties of topological spaces